Kieser is a surname. Notable people with the surname include:

 Dietrich Georg von Kieser (1779–1862), German physician
 Hans-Lukas Kieser (born 1957), Swiss historian of the late Ottoman Empire and Turkey

See also
 Kiesler

German-language surnames